James Alexander Birkinshaw (born 6 March 1980 in Sheffield, England) is a former professional motorcycle speedway rider, who rode for Birmingham Brummies.

During the 2002 Speedway Conference League season he won the Conference League Riders' Championship.

References 

1980 births
Living people
British speedway riders
English motorcycle racers
Workington Comets riders
Sheffield Tigers riders
Stoke Potters riders
Birmingham Brummies riders
Glasgow Tigers riders
Newcastle Diamonds riders